Svalia may refer to: 

Svalia, Norway, a village in Overhalla municipality in Trøndelag county, Norway
Svalia (river), a 36-km long river in northern Lithuania and a tributary of the Lėvuo river